Events in the year 1139 in Norway.

Incumbents
 Monarchs – Sigurd II Haraldsson and Inge I Haraldsson

Events
12 November – Battle of Holmengrå.

Arts and literature

Births

Deaths
12 November – Magnus IV of Norway, King (born c. 1115).
Sigurd Slembe, pretender to the throne.

References

Norway